Villa Nova Atlético Clube, commonly known as Villa Nova, is a Brazilian professional association football club based in Nova Lima, Minas Gerais. The team plays in Série D, the fourth tier of the Brazilian football league system, as well as in the Campeonato Mineiro, the top tier of the Minas Gerais state football league.

Founded on 28 June 1908, Their home stadium is the Castor Cifuentes, whose capacity is 15,000. They play in red and white striped shirts, red shorts and red socks.

History
Villa Nova was founded on 28 June 1908, in Nova Lima, by English factory workers and miners of Mineração Morro Velho S.A.. Villa Nova was the first club of Minas Gerais to have players called up to the Brazil national football team.

Martim Francisco, coach of the club in 1951, was during this passage pointing out as the inventor of 4-2-4.  This fact was highlighted in the book 'Inverting Pyramid' by Jonathan Wilson (considered the Bible of the history of tactics in football)

In 1971, Villa Nova won the Campeonato Brasileiro Série B first edition after beating Remo in the final.

Stadium

Villa Nova's stadium is Estádio Castor Cifuentes, built in 1989, with a maximum capacity of 15,000 people.

Supporters
Below is the list of the supporters historical team:

Dick, Madeira, Luizinho, Anísio Canelão and Eberval; Lito, Vaduca and Foguete; Gil, Paulinho Cai-Cai and Benedito Custódio Ferreira "Escurinho".
Coach: Brandãozinho

Achievements
Campeonato Mineiro: 1932, 1933, 1934, 1935, 1951
Campeonato Mineiro do Interior: 1996, 1997, 1998, 1999.
Taça Minas Gerais: 1977, 2006
Torneio de Incentivo: 1976, 1987
Campeonato Brasileiro Série B: 1971
Campeonato Mineiro Módulo II: 1995, 2021
Copa Centro Sul do Brasil: 1968
Copa Centro de Minas Gerais: 1974

Mascot
The club's mascot is a lion.

References

External links
Villa Nova Official Website

 
Association football clubs established in 1908
Football clubs in Minas Gerais
1908 establishments in Brazil